The swimming competition at the 1975 Mediterranean Games was held in Algiers, Algeria.

Medallists

Men's events

Women's events

Medal table

References
International Mediterranean Games Committee

Mediterranean Games
Sports at the 1975 Mediterranean Games
1975